The 1986–87 Ashes series was a series of five Test cricket matches that were contested between England and Australia for The Ashes. The series was played at five venues across Australia, starting on 14 November 1986 in Brisbane and concluding on 15 January 1987 in Sydney. England were the defending holders of the Ashes going into the series, having reclaimed the urn in 1985.

England, under the leadership of Mike Gatting, successfully retained the Ashes after winning the Boxing Day Test match in Melbourne.

Venues

The ordering of the venues was slightly different to the previous Australian Ashes series, with a swap between Perth and Brisbane.

Test series

1st Test

England's achievement in winning this match, especially against the backdrop of their early tour form, surprised many observers, one of the visiting journalists famously observing that Mike Gatting's side had only three major problems: "They can't bat, they can't bowl, and they can't field". For Australia, with such high hopes against the "old enemy", the loss was depressing and indicated yet again that Australia's young side still had a long way to go before they could be competitive.

England's first innings was dominated by Ian Botham's 138 off 174 balls - his last test century. He was especially severe on Australian Bowler Merv Hughes, playing in only his second Test. Important also were the return to form of Gower (51) and Captain Gatting (61). A rain-shortened first day meant that Australia was 1–33 by the start of day 3. Australia's first innings was effectively ended by Kent seamer Graham Dilley, although all the bowlers were effective in either taking wickets or restricting runs. Geoff Marsh continued his good form from the previous tour match, scoring 56 in 205 minutes.

Unfortunately for Australia, their first innings fell 8 runs short of avoiding the follow-on. Their second innings was dominated by Marsh's 110 off 392 minutes (by the end of this innings, Marsh had batted 1188 minutes – nearly 20 hours – in four innings against England). England's bowling was dominated by Emburey's 5/80: he conceded fewer than 2 runs per over. Australia was bowled out for 282 and England easily knocked off the runs required.

2nd Test

England again batted first and racked up a large total, Chris Broad and Jack Richards both making maiden test centuries and Bill Athey falling only four runs short. David Gower also made a hundred. But this time Australia did manage to avoid the follow-on, narrowly, largely thanks to runs from Allan Border, and the game petered out into a draw. As of 2022 this is the last occasion on which England avoided defeat in a Test match at Perth.

3rd Test

The absence of Botham affected England more than the absence of Tim Zoehrer affected Australia, and this time Australia seized the advantage, the whole top order supporting David Boon's hundred. However hundreds from Broad and Gatting, lost time and a relatively tame pitch ensured another draw.  With England 1-0 up, holding the Ashes and two tests to play, Australia left Adelaide needing to win both remaining Tests to reclaim the Ashes.

4th Test

Australia, in losing this match, marked their 14th Test in succession without a victory. By any statistical analysis, Australia had reached their all-time historic "low" when the match ended. Chris Broad became the third English batsman, after Jack Hobbs and Wally Hammond, to score hundreds in three consecutive Ashes Tests. Allan Border later criticised the Australian selectors for picking a team with only four specialist batsmen – Border said he wanted to pick Greg Ritchie but was overruled.

5th Test

This match will always be remembered as "Taylor's match". When the team for the Test was announced, the Australian selectors had included the name of Peter Taylor from NSW. Thinking that a mistake in names had been made, the Australian media besieged the home of the talented young NSW opener Mark Taylor, thinking that he had been selected to play his first Test. Although history shows that Mark Taylor had a substantial Test career later on, the selectors had made no mistake in the name. NSW off-spinner Peter Taylor had impressed some selectors (especially Greg Chappell) with his all-round abilities during the previous season's Sheffield Shield final. He was noted as an off-spinner who really spun the ball and a number of the wickets he took during the test match were attributed to his 'loop' (the deceptive flight of a heavily spun cricket ball) and bounce from his unusual but high bowling action. Considering Peter Taylor's limited first-class experience, the selection was risky. The selection was unexpected to the point that the media quickly dubbed him "Peter Who?", and he became something of a celebrity leading up to the match. Spectators voiced their opinion too on the first day of the match. "Aussie Selectors couldn't pick Bill Lawry's Nose" declared one banner. However, Taylor later received the man of the match award.

The Australian first innings was dominated by Jones' 184 not out – his first century of the season and only his second Test century. Jones was lucky not to be out for 5, as video replays seemed to indicate that he had been caught behind. Australia managed 343 in the first innings, with Jones featuring in some very important late-wicket partnerships.

Given the dominance of England's batting throughout the season and the limited nature of Australia's bowling, both sides were surprised as England stuttered to 3/17 in their first innings, with Merv Hughes providing the venom he had been promising. Hughes, still inexperienced at this point, was one of the players the selectors stuck with despite his poor form. England recovered somewhat through the strokeplay of Gower and an unexpected 69 from John Emburey (who kept falling over when playing the sweep shot). But it was debutant Peter Taylor taking 6/78 off 26 overs that ran through the middle order, including the dangerous Ian Botham.

Australia's second innings began badly again, then recovered slightly while Jones and Border were batting, then slumped again to 7/145. Steve Waugh (73) partnered Peter Taylor (42) in a 98 run partnership that, in the end, proved to be match-winning. Waugh, still potentially "the next big thing" and in front of his home crowd, was an attractive stroke-maker while Taylor, on the other hand, had little natural strokeplay but relied upon his concentration. John Emburey, the English off Spinner, was taking every advantage of the wearing pitch with 7/78 off 46 overs.

With 320 to win on a wearing pitch, England applied themselves against the inexperienced Australian attack and aimed for victory. Gatting, out for 0 in the first innings, took England to 5/233, but was out caught and bowled to All-rounder Steve Waugh for 96. With the pitch getting worse, England put off thoughts of victory and worked to draw the match. John Emburey batted for over an hour for his 22, but was clean bowled in the penultimate over to a Peter Sleep leg-spinner that kept low. This gave Australia its first victory in 14 Tests. Peter Sleep finished with 5/72 – his only 5 wicket haul in Tests.

Notes

References

External links
 Series home at ESPNcricinfo

The Ashes
International cricket competitions from 1985–86 to 1988
Ashes series
Ashes series
Ashes